Hajjiabad (also Romanized as Ḥājjīābād; also known as Ḥājjīābād-e Bākharz) is a village in Bakharz Rural District, in the Central District of Bakharz County, Razavi Khorasan Province, Iran. At the 2006 census, its population was 496, in 118 families.

References 

Populated places in Bakharz County